Reeders is an unincorporated community in Jackson Township in Monroe County, Pennsylvania, United States. Reeders is located at the intersection of Pennsylvania Route 715 and Reeders Run Road.

References

Unincorporated communities in Monroe County, Pennsylvania
Unincorporated communities in Pennsylvania